Lincoln green is the colour of dyed woollen cloth formerly originating in Lincoln, England, a major cloth town during the high Middle Ages. The dyers of Lincoln, known for colouring wool with woad (Isatis tinctoria) to give it a strong blue shade, created the eponymous Lincoln green by overdyeing this blue wool with yellow weld (Reseda luteola) or dyers' broom, Genista tinctoria. Other colours like "Coventry blue" and "Kendal green" were linked to the dyers of different English towns.

Lincoln green is often associated with Robin Hood and his Merry Men in Sherwood Forest, Nottinghamshire.

History
The first recorded use of Lincoln green as a colour name in English was in 1510.  By the late sixteenth century, Lincoln green was a thing of the past. Michael Drayton provided a sidenote in his Poly-Olbion (published 1612): "Lincoln anciently dyed the best green in England." Cloth of Lincoln green was more pleasing than undyed shepherd's gray cloth: "When they were clothed in Lyncolne grene they kest away their gray", according to A Lytell Geste of Robyn Hode, ca. 1510, and Lincoln green betokened an old-fashioned forester even in the fancy dress of Edmund Spenser's The Faery Queene: 

Robin Hood's Garland, the popular ballad printed in eighteenth-century compilations, offers an unexpected picture of Robin as he presented himself at court:

The distinction was in the cost of scarlet, which was dyed with kermes, derived from the Kermes vermilio insect native to the Mediterranean. Lincoln scarlet, from its imported dyestuff, was more expensive than Lincoln green. 

In 1198 the Sheriff of Lincoln bought ninety ells (about 112 yards) of scarlet cloth for £30 (6s 8d per ell); although the cloth was a finely finished fabric, its high price was almost certainly due mainly to the extremely costly dye-stuff, greyne (graine) from Kermes or scarlet grain.  In 1182 the Sheriff of Lincoln bought Scarlet at 6s 8d/ell, Green and Blanchet both at 3s/ell and Gray at approximately 1s 8d/ell. By 1216 three guilds controlling the cloth trade were established in Lincoln, the Weavers', Dyers', and Fullers' guilds.

Modern survivals
"Lincoln green" was revived in the years prior to the First World War, when it was adopted as the colour of the full-dress uniform of the Lincolnshire Yeomanry. This military version took the form of a distinctively light shade, which contrasted sharply with the sombre rifle green widely worn by other regiments of the British Army. Lincoln green was also worn as the facing colour on the scarlet tunics of the Sherwood Foresters Regiment from 1913.

The world renowned ice dancers Jayne Torvill and Christopher Dean, who both originate from Nottinghamshire in the East Midlands, wore "Lincoln green" during their free dance at the 1980 Winter Olympics in Lake Placid.

In popular culture
In 'The Friar's Tale', part of The Canterbury Tales, Geoffrey Chaucer has the Corrupt Summoner meet a devil disguised as a Yeoman dressed in Lincoln green

Sir Walter Scott in his 1820 novel Ivanhoe mentioned Lincoln green three times: in Chapter 7 ("One of these, a stout well-set yeoman, arrayed in Lincoln green, having twelve arrows stuck in his belt...."), Chapter 15 ("...[I]f thou losest [the prize] thou shalt be stript of thy Lincoln green...."), and Chapter 23 (...[O]ne hundred yards of Lincoln green to make doublets to thy men....").

William Makepeace Thackeray in his 1848 novel Vanity Fair mentioned Lincoln green in Chapter III: "What causes them to labour at piano-forte sonatas, and to learn four songs from a fashionable master at a guinea a lesson, and to play the harp if they have handsome arms and neat elbows, and to wear Lincoln Green toxopholite hats and feathers, but that they may bring down some "desirable" young man with those killing bows and arrows of theirs?"

The colour appears used in the dystopian novel Shades of Grey 1: The Road to High Saffron by Jasper Fforde, in which shades of green—and Lincoln green in particular—have narcotic effects.

In Chapter One of the 1938 novel The Fashion in Shrouds by Margery Allingham, in setting the scene for the “Whodunnit”, the fortunes of a fashion house are revived “from the day that the Valentine cape in Lincoln-green face-cloth flickered across the salon and won the hearts of twenty-five professional buyers and subsequently five hundred private purchasers…”.

See also 
 Lists of colours

Notes

Shades of green
Plant dyes
Robin Hood
History of Lincolnshire
Lincoln, England